"Dance wit' Me" is a song by American singer Rick James. It is the opening track on James' 1982 album Throwin' Down.

Background
The song features Roy Ayers playing a vibes solo on the song.

Chart performance
Released as the second single from Throwin' Down, it peaked at number three on the Billboard R&B Singles chart, and number sixty-four on the Hot 100. On the US Dance chart, "Dance wit' Me" peaked at number seven.

References

1982 singles
Rick James songs
Songs written by Rick James
1982 songs
Gordy Records singles